Akkarayan Aru is a river in Northern Province, Sri Lanka. The river rises in north-west Mullaitivu District, before flowing north through Mullaitivu District and Kilinochchi District. The river empties into Jaffna Lagoon.

See also 
 List of rivers in Sri Lanka

References 

Rivers of Sri Lanka
Bodies of water of Kilinochchi District
Bodies of water of Mullaitivu District